It Happened at Lakewood Manor (also known by the titles Ants and Panic at Lakewood Manor) is a 1977 American made-for-television horror film starring Lynda Day George, Suzanne Somers, Myrna Loy, Brian Dennehy and Bernie Casey. It was directed by Robert Scheerer and premiered December 2, 1977 on ABC.

Plot
During construction at the old, hard-pressed Lakewood Hotel, two workers stumble upon a swarm of ants in a closed section of the building.  After discovering the ants to be unusually aggressive and dangerous, the workers attempt to get the warning out, but are accidentally buried alive.

Shortly after, the unscrupulous real estate magnate Anthony Fleming (Gerald Gordon) and his partner and mistress Gloria (Suzanne Somers) arrive at the hotel, there to haggle with the elderly proprietor, Ethel Adams (Myrna Loy) and her daughter Valerie (Lynda Day George) as they pursue plans to convert Lakewood into a casino. In the meantime, foreman Mike Carr (Robert Foxworth), who is in a relationship with Valerie, and his co-worker and friend Vince (Bernie Casey) find the two missing workers, dead from poisoning. The ants begin to emerge, attacking a boy, then killing a hotel cook, and nearly killing Vince as he and Mike investigate the pit in which their men were buried.

Peggy Kenter (Anita Gillette), a Board of Health (BOH) inspector and an acquaintance of Carr's, decides to quarantine the hotel, thinking a virus is at work. Mike soon discovers that there is an immense ant nest in the pit, and concludes that these insects are responsible for the attacks. Tom (Bruce French), a BOH researcher, finally discovers that the ants are highly venomous and resistant to insecticides.

By that time, the ants are swarming the hotel by the millions, killing Gloria and Peggy's assistant White (Steve Franken) and driving Carr, Valerie, Ethel, Fleming, hotel employee Richard (Barry Van Dyke) and his girlfriend Linda (Karen Lamm) upstairs. Vince alerts the authorities, who attempt to contain the ants with a trench - filled first with water, then with burning gasoline after Tom points out that army ants cross streams on bridges built from ant corpses - and rescue most of the people trapped inside the hotel. Carr, Valerie and Fleming, the only people remaining, are eventually cornered by the ants; Tom tells them not to move, in order to give the ants no reason to attack them. As the ants begin crawling all over them, Fleming panickedly launches himself from the room's balcony to the swimming pool below in a desperate attempt to escape, but misses the jump and dies in the fall. Shortly afterwards, two suited-up rescuers arrive and take Carr and Valerie to safety.

When they are taken away by the ambulance, Tom assures Carr that such a case will not likely be recurring, as the unique environmental conditions at the hotel estate were vital for the existence of the ants' nest.

Cast

 Robert Foxworth as Mike Carr
 Lynda Day George as Valerie Adams
 Gerald Gordon as Anthony Fleming
 Bernie Casey as Vince
 Barry Van Dyke as Richard Cyril
 Karen Lamm as Linda Howard
 Myrna Loy as Ethel Adams
 Anita Gillette as Peggy Kenter
 Steve Franken as Lionel White
 Brian Dennehy as Fire Chief 
 Suzanne Somers as Gloria Henderson
 Bruce French as Tom
 Barbara Brownell as Marjorie
 Stacy Keach Sr. as Doc
 René Enríquez as Luis
 Moosie Drier as Tommy
 Vincent Cobb as Peter
 Jim Storm as Attendant

Production
The location for Lakewood Manor was The College Inn in Qualicum Beach BC, Canada.

Stuntman Conrad Palmisano was buried alive for the film (with a garden hose supplying him air); he would later become chairman of the Screen Actors Guild's stunt and safety committee.

Release
It Happened at Lakewood Manor was released as Ants on DVD on February 9, 2014. It was released on blu-ray by Kino Lorber as Ants! in 2022 with a commentary track by film historian Lee Gambin.

References

External links 
 

1977 films
1977 horror films
1977 television films
ABC network original films
American television films
Fictional ants
Films about ants
Films directed by Robert Scheerer
Films set in hotels
Films shot in British Columbia
American natural horror films
1970s American films